Sams Plantation Complex Tabby Ruins is a historic plantation complex and archaeological site located at Frogmore, Beaufort County, South Carolina.  The site, possibly built upon and occupied well before 1783.  It includes the ruins and/or archaeological remains of at least 12 tabby structures. They include the main plantation house,  a rectangular enclosure consisting of tabby walls, a large tabby kitchen, and five tabby slave quarters. Also on the property were a variety of tabby dependencies including a barn/stable, a smoke house or blade house, a well/dairy house, and a well. The property also includes the Sams family cemetery and Episcopal chapel enclosed by high tabby walls. Other structures include possibly an overseer's house, a granary/mill, and a tabby cotton house. During and subsequent to the American Civil War the Sams Tabby Complex was occupied by freedman. Following the Civil War the plantation house was destroyed by hurricanes.

It was listed in the National Register of Historic Places in 2011.

References

External links

Historic American Buildings Survey in South Carolina
Plantations in South Carolina
Archaeological sites on the National Register of Historic Places in South Carolina
Buildings and structures in Beaufort County, South Carolina
National Register of Historic Places in Beaufort County, South Carolina
Tabby buildings
Cotton plantations in the United States
Plantation houses in South Carolina
Slave cabins and quarters in the United States
Ruins in the United States